The Colby Free Press is a local newspaper published in Colby, Kansas. It is the official newspaper for Thomas County, Kansas. It publishes four days a week, Monday and Wednesday through Friday.

U.S. Representative John R. Connelly was its owner and editor from 1897 until 1919.

References

Newspapers published in Kansas
Thomas County, Kansas
Publications established in 1888
1888 establishments in Kansas